Hinduism is an Indian religion or dharma, a religious and universal order or way of life by which followers abide. As a religion, it is the world's third-largest, with over 1.2–1.35 billion followers, or 15–16% of the global population, known as Hindus. The word Hindu is an exonym, and while Hinduism has been called the oldest religion in the world, many practitioners refer to their religion as Sanātana Dharma, a modern usage, which refers to the idea that its origins lie beyond human history, as revealed in the Hindu texts. Another endonym is Vaidika Dharma, the dharma related to the Vedas.

Hinduism is a diverse system of thought marked by a range of philosophies and shared concepts, rituals, cosmological systems, pilgrimage sites, and shared textual sources that discuss theology, metaphysics, mythology, Vedic yajna, yoga, agamic rituals, and temple building, among other topics. Prominent themes in Hindu beliefs include the four Puruṣārthas, the proper goals or aims of human life; namely, dharma (ethics/duties), artha (prosperity/work), kama (desires/passions) and moksha (liberation/freedom from the passions and the cycle of death and rebirth), as well as karma (action, intent and consequences) and saṃsāra (cycle of death and rebirth). Hinduism prescribes the eternal duties, such as honesty, refraining from injuring living beings (Ahiṃsā), patience, forbearance, self-restraint, virtue, and compassion, among others. Hindu practices include worship (puja), fire rituals (homa/havan), recitations (pravachan), devotion (bhakti), chanting (japa), meditation (dhyāna), sacrifice (yajña), charity (dāna), selfless service (sevā), homage to one's ancestors (śrāddha), family-oriented rites of passage, annual festivals, and occasional pilgrimages (yatra). Along with the various practices associated with yoga, some Hindus leave their social world and material possessions and engage in lifelong Sannyasa (monasticism) in order to achieve moksha.

Hindu texts are classified into Śruti ("heard") and Smṛti ("remembered"), the major scriptures of which are the Vedas, the Upanishads, the Purānas, the Mahābhārata, the Rāmāyana, and the Āgamas. There are six āstika schools of Hindu philosophy, who recognise the authority of the Vedas, namely Sānkhya, Yoga, Nyāya, Vaisheshika, Mimāmsā, and Vedānta. While the Puranic chronology presents a genealogy of thousands of years, starting with the Vedic rishis, scholars regard Hinduism as a fusion or synthesis of Brahmanical orthopraxy with various Indian cultures, having diverse roots and no specific founder. This Hindu synthesis emerged after the Vedic period, between c. 500–200 BCE and c. 300 CE, in the period of the Second Urbanisation and the early classical period of Hinduism, when the Epics and the first Purānas were composed. It flourished in the medieval period, with the decline of Buddhism in India.

Currently, the four major denominations of Hinduism are Vaishnavism, Shaivism, Shaktism, and the Smarta tradition. Sources of authority and eternal truths in the Hindu texts play an important role, but there is also a strong Hindu tradition of questioning authority in order to deepen the understanding of these truths and to further develop the tradition. Hinduism is the most widely professed faith in India, Nepal, Mauritius and in Bali, Indonesia. Significant numbers of Hindu communities are found in other countries of South Asia, in Southeast Asia, in the Caribbean, Gulf states, North America, Europe, Oceania, Africa, and other regions.

Etymology 

The word Hindū is derived from Indo-Aryan/Sanskrit root Sindhu, believed to be the name of the Indus River in the northwestern part of the Indian subcontinent. 

The Proto-Iranian sound change *s > h occurred between 850 and 600 BCE, according to Asko Parpola. According to Gavin Flood, "The actual term Hindu first occurs as a Persian geographical term for the people who lived beyond the river Indus (Sanskrit: Sindhu)", more specifically in the 6th-century BCE inscription of Darius I (550–486 BCE). The term Hindu in these ancient records is a geographical term and did not refer to a religion. Thapar states that the word Hindu is found as heptahindu in Avesta – equivalent to Rigvedic sapta sindhu, while hndstn (pronounced Hindustan) is found in a Sasanian inscription from the 3rd century CE, both of which refer to parts of northwestern South Asia.  In Arabic texts, al-Hind referred to the land beyond the Indus and therefore, all the people in that land were Hindus. This Arabic term was itself taken from the pre-Islamic Persian term Hindū. By the 13th century, Hindustan emerged as a popular alternative name of India, meaning the "land of Hindus".

Among the earliest known records of 'Hindu' with connotations of religion may be in the 7th-century CE Chinese text Record of the Western Regions by Xuanzang, and 14th-century Persian text Futuhu's-salatin by 'Abd al-Malik Isami. Some 16-18th century Bengali Gaudiya Vaishnava texts mention Hindu and Hindu dharma to distinguish from Muslims without positively defining these terms. In the 18th century, the European merchants and colonists began to refer to the followers of Indian religions collectively as Hindus. The use of the English term "Hinduism" to describe a collection of practices and beliefs is a fairly recent construction. According to Singh, it was first used by Raja Ram Mohan Roy in 1816–17. According to other authors, the term "Hinduism" was coined in around 1830, and appropriated by those Indians who opposed British colonialism, and who wanted to distinguish themselves from Muslims and Christians. Before the British began to categorise communities strictly by religion, Indians generally did not define themselves exclusively through their religious beliefs; instead identities were largely segmented on the basis of locality, language, varṇa, jāti, occupation, and sect. This the British colonisers did roughly in the 19th century to evolve a common law to facilitate governance.

Definitions 
Hinduism includes a diversity of ideas on spirituality and traditions, but has no ecclesiastical order, no unquestionable religious authorities, no governing body, no prophet(s) nor any binding holy book; Hindus can choose to be polytheistic, pantheistic, panentheistic, pandeistic, henotheistic, monotheistic, monistic, agnostic, atheistic or humanist. According to Doniger, "ideas about all the major issues of faith and lifestyle – vegetarianism, nonviolence, belief in rebirth, even caste – are subjects of debate, not dogma."

Because of the wide range of traditions and ideas covered by the term Hinduism, arriving at a comprehensive definition is difficult. The religion "defies our desire to define and categorize it". Hinduism has been variously defined as a religion, a religious tradition, a set of religious beliefs, and "a way of life". From a Western lexical standpoint, Hinduism like other faiths is appropriately referred to as a religion. In India, the term dharma is preferred, which is broader than the Western term religion.

The study of India and its cultures and religions, and the definition of "Hinduism", has been shaped by the interests of colonialism and by Western notions of religion. Since the 1990s, those influences and its outcomes have been the topic of debate among scholars of Hinduism, and have also been taken over by critics of the Western view on India.

Typology 

Hinduism as it is commonly known can be subdivided into a number of major currents. Of the historical division into six darsanas (philosophies), two schools, Vedanta and Yoga, are currently the most prominent. Classified by primary deity or deities, four major Hinduism modern currents are Shaivism (Shiva), Vaishnavism (Vishnu), Shaktism (Devi) and Smartism (five deities treated as equals). Hinduism also accepts numerous divine beings, with many Hindus considering the deities to be aspects or manifestations of a single impersonal absolute or ultimate reality or God, while some Hindus maintain that a specific deity represents the supreme and various deities are lower manifestations of this supreme. Other notable characteristics include a belief in the existence of ātman (Self), reincarnation of one's ātman, and karma as well as a belief in dharma (duties, rights, laws, conduct, virtues and right way of living), although variation exists, with some not following these beliefs.

McDaniel (2007) classifies Hinduism into six major kinds and numerous minor kinds, in order to understand the expression of emotions among the Hindus. The major kinds, according to McDaniel are Folk Hinduism, based on local traditions and cults of local deities and is the oldest, non-literate system; Vedic Hinduism based on the earliest layers of the Vedas traceable to 2nd millennium BCE; Vedantic Hinduism based on the philosophy of the Upanishads, including Advaita Vedanta, emphasizing knowledge and wisdom; Yogic Hinduism, following the text of Yoga Sutras of Patanjali emphasizing introspective awareness; Dharmic Hinduism or "daily morality", which McDaniel states is stereotyped in some books as the "only form of Hindu religion with a belief in karma, cows and caste"; and bhakti or devotional Hinduism, where intense emotions are elaborately incorporated in the pursuit of the spiritual.

Michaels distinguishes three Hindu religions and four forms of Hindu religiosity. The three Hindu religions are "Brahmanic-Sanskritic Hinduism", "folk religions and tribal religions", and "founded religions". The four forms of Hindu religiosity are the classical "karma-marga", jnana-marga, bhakti-marga, and "heroism", which is rooted in militaristic traditions. These militaristic traditions include Ramaism (the worship of a hero of epic literature, Rama, believing him to be an incarnation of Vishnu) and parts of political Hinduism.  "Heroism" is also called virya-marga. According to Michaels, one out of nine Hindu belongs by birth to one or both of the Brahmanic-Sanskritic Hinduism and Folk religion typology, whether practicing or non-practicing. He classifies most Hindus as belonging by choice to one of the "founded religions" such as Vaishnavism and Shaivism that are moksha-focussed and often de-emphasize Brahman priestly authority yet incorporate ritual grammar of Brahmanic-Sanskritic Hinduism. He includes among "founded religions" Buddhism, Jainism, Sikhism that are now distinct religions, syncretic movements such as Brahmo Samaj and the Theosophical Society, as well as various "Guru-isms" and new religious movements such as Maharishi Mahesh Yogi and ISKCON.

Inden states that the attempt to classify Hinduism by typology started in the imperial times, when proselytizing missionaries and colonial officials sought to understand and portray Hinduism from their interests. Hinduism was construed as emanating not from a reason of spirit but fantasy and creative imagination, not conceptual but symbolical, not ethical but emotive, not rational or spiritual but of cognitive mysticism. This stereotype followed and fit, states Inden, with the imperial imperatives of the era, providing the moral justification for the colonial project. From tribal Animism to Buddhism, everything was subsumed as part of Hinduism. The early reports set the tradition and scholarly premises for the typology of Hinduism, as well as the major assumptions and flawed presuppositions that have been at the foundation of Indology. Hinduism, according to Inden, has been neither what imperial religionists stereotyped it to be, nor is it appropriate to equate Hinduism to be merely the monist pantheism and philosophical idealism of Advaita Vedanta.

Hindu views

To its adherents, Hinduism is a traditional way of life. Hindus regard Hinduism to be thousands of years old. The Puranic chronology, the timeline of events in ancient Indian history as narrated in the Mahabharata, the Ramayana, and the Puranas, envisions a chronology of events related to Hinduism starting well before 3000 BCE. The Sanskrit word dharma has a much broader meaning than religion and is not its equivalent. All aspects of a Hindu life, namely acquiring wealth (artha), fulfillment of desires (kama), and attaining liberation (moksha), are part of dharma, which encapsulates the "right way of living" and eternal harmonious principles in their fulfillment.

According to the editors of the Encyclopædia Britannica,  historically referred to the "eternal" duties religiously ordained in Hinduism, duties such as honesty, refraining from injuring living beings (ahiṃsā), purity, goodwill, mercy, patience, forbearance, self-restraint, generosity, and asceticism. These duties applied regardless of a Hindu's class, caste, or sect, and they contrasted with svadharma, one's "own duty", in accordance with one's class or caste (varṇa) and stage in life (puruṣārtha). In recent years, the term has been used by Hindu leaders, reformers, and nationalists to refer to Hinduism. Sanatana dharma has become a synonym for the "eternal" truth and teachings of Hinduism, that transcend history and are "unchanging, indivisible and ultimately nonsectarian".

According to other scholars such as Kim Knott and Brian Hatcher, Sanātana Dharma refers to "timeless, eternal set of truths" and this is how Hindus view the origins of their religion. It is viewed as those eternal truths and tradition with origins beyond human history, truths divinely revealed (Shruti) in the Vedas – the most ancient of the world's scriptures. To many Hindus, the Western term "religion" to the extent it means "dogma and an institution traceable to a single founder" is inappropriate for their tradition, states Hatcher. Hinduism, to them, is a tradition that can be traced at least to the ancient Vedic era.

Vaidika dharma 

Some have referred to Hinduism as the Vaidika dharma. The word 'Vaidika' in Sanskrit means 'derived from or conformable to the Veda' or 'relating to the Veda'. Traditional scholars employed the terms Vaidika and Avaidika, those who accept the Vedas as a source of authoritative knowledge and those who do not, to differentiate various Indian schools from Jainism, Buddhism and Charvaka. According to Klaus Klostermaier, the term Vaidika dharma is the earliest self-designation of Hinduism. According to Arvind Sharma, the historical evidence suggests that "the Hindus were referring to their religion by the term vaidika dharma or a variant thereof" by the 4th-century CE. According to Brian K. Smith, "[i]t is 'debatable at the very least' as to whether the term Vaidika Dharma cannot, with the proper concessions to historical, cultural, and ideological specificity, be comparable to and translated as 'Hinduism' or 'Hindu religion'."

Whatever the case, many Hindu religious sources see persons or groups which they consider as non-Vedic (and which reject Vedic varṇāśrama - 'caste and life stage' orthodoxy) as being heretics (pāṣaṇḍa/pākhaṇḍa). For example, the Bhāgavata Purāṇa, an extremely influential Hindu Puranic source, considers Buddhists, Jains as well as some Shaiva groups like the Paśupatas and Kāpālins to be pāṣaṇḍas (heretics).

According to Alexis Sanderson, the early Sanskrit texts differentiate between Vaidika, Vaishnava, Shaiva, Shakta, Saura, Buddhist and Jaina traditions. However, the late 1st-millennium CE Indic consensus had "indeed come to conceptualize a complex entity corresponding to Hinduism as opposed to Buddhism and Jainism excluding only certain forms of antinomian Shakta-Shaiva" from its fold. Some in the Mimamsa school of Hindu philosophy considered the Agamas such as the Pancaratrika to be invalid because it did not conform to the Vedas. Some Kashmiri scholars rejected the esoteric tantric traditions to be a part of Vaidika dharma. The Atimarga Shaivism ascetic tradition, datable to about 500 CE, challenged the Vaidika frame and insisted that their Agamas and practices were not only valid, they were superior than those of the Vaidikas. However, adds Sanderson, this Shaiva ascetic tradition viewed themselves as being genuinely true to the Vedic tradition and "held unanimously that the Śruti and Smṛti of Brahmanism are universally and uniquely valid in their own sphere, [...] and that as such they [Vedas] are man's sole means of valid knowledge [...]".

The term Vaidika dharma means a code of practice that is "based on the Vedas", but it is unclear what "based on the Vedas" really implies, states Julius Lipner. The Vaidika dharma or "Vedic way of life", states Lipner, does not mean "Hinduism is necessarily religious" or that Hindus have a universally accepted "conventional or institutional meaning" for that term. To many, it is as much a cultural term. Many Hindus do not have a copy of the Vedas nor have they ever seen or personally read parts of a Veda, like a Christian, might relate to the Bible or a Muslim might to the Quran. Yet, states Lipner, "this does not mean that their [Hindus] whole life's orientation cannot be traced to the Vedas or that it does not in some way derive from it".

Though many religious Hindus implicitly acknowledge the authority of the Vedas, this acknowledgment is often "no more than a declaration that someone considers himself [or herself] a Hindu," and "most Indians today pay lip service to the Veda and have no regard for the contents of the text." Some Hindus challenge the authority of the Vedas, thereby implicitly acknowledging its importance to the history of Hinduism, states Lipner.

Hindu modernism 

Beginning in the 19th century, Indian modernists re-asserted Hinduism as a major asset of Indian civilisation, meanwhile "purifying" Hinduism from its Tantric elements and elevating the Vedic elements. Western stereotypes were reversed, emphasizing the universal aspects, and introducing modern approaches of social problems. This approach had a great appeal, not only in India, but also in the west. Major representatives of "Hindu modernism" are Ram Mohan Roy, Swami Vivekananda, Sarvepalli Radhakrishnan and Mahatma Gandhi.
Raja Rammohan Roy is known as the father of the Hindu Renaissance. He was a major influence on Swami Vivekananda (1863–1902), who, according to Flood, was "a figure of great importance in the development of a modern Hindu self-understanding and in formulating the West's view of Hinduism". Central to his philosophy is the idea that the divine exists in all beings, that all human beings can achieve union with this "innate divinity", and that seeing this divine as the essence of others will further love and social harmony. According to Vivekananda, there is an essential unity to Hinduism, which underlies the diversity of its many forms. According to Flood, Vivekananda's vision of Hinduism "is one generally accepted by most English-speaking middle-class Hindus today". Sarvepalli Radhakrishnan sought to reconcile western rationalism with Hinduism, "presenting Hinduism as an essentially rationalistic and humanistic religious experience".

This "Global Hinduism" has a worldwide appeal, transcending national boundaries and, according to Flood, "becoming a world religion alongside Christianity, Islam and Buddhism", both for the Hindu diaspora communities and for westerners who are attracted to non-western cultures and religions. It emphasizes universal spiritual values such as social justice, peace and "the spiritual transformation of humanity". It has developed partly due to "re-enculturation", or the Pizza effect, in which elements of Hindu culture have been exported to the West, gaining popularity there, and as a consequence also gained greater popularity in India. This globalization of Hindu culture brought "to the West teachings which have become an important cultural force in western societies, and which in turn have become an important cultural force in India, their place of origin".

Legal definitions 
The definition of Hinduism in Indian Law is: "Acceptance of the Vedas with reverence; recognition of the fact that the means or ways to Moksha are diverse; and realization of the truth that the number of gods to be worshipped is large".

Scholarly views 
The term Hinduism was coined in Western ethnography in the 18th century, and refers to the fusion or synthesis of various Indian cultures and traditions, with diverse roots and no founder. This Hindu synthesis emerged after the Vedic period, between c. 500–200 BCE and c. 300 CE, in the period of the Second Urbanisation and the early classical period of Hinduism, when the Epics and the first Puranas were composed. It flourished in the medieval period, with the decline of Buddhism in India. Hinduism's tolerance to variations in belief and its broad range of traditions make it difficult to define as a religion according to traditional Western conceptions.

Some academics suggest that Hinduism can be seen as a category with "fuzzy edges" rather than as a well-defined and rigid entity. Some forms of religious expression are central to Hinduism and others, while not as central, still remain within the category. Based on this idea Gabriella Eichinger Ferro-Luzzi has developed a 'Prototype Theory approach' to the definition of Hinduism.

Diversity and unity

Diversity 

Hindu beliefs are vast and diverse, and thus Hinduism is often referred to as a family of religions rather than a single religion. Within each religion in this family of religions, there are different theologies, practices, and sacred texts. Hinduism does not have a "unified system of belief encoded in a declaration of faith or a creed", but is rather an umbrella term comprising the plurality of religious phenomena of India. According to the Supreme Court of India,

Part of the problem with a single definition of the term Hinduism is the fact that Hinduism does not have a founder. It is a synthesis of various traditions, the "Brahmanical orthopraxy, the renouncer traditions and popular or local traditions".

Theism is also difficult to use as a unifying doctrine for Hinduism, because while some Hindu philosophies postulate a theistic ontology of creation, other Hindus are or have been atheists.

Sense of unity 
Despite the differences, there is also a sense of unity. Most Hindu traditions revere a body of religious or sacred literature, the Vedas, although there are exceptions. These texts are a reminder of the ancient cultural heritage and point of pride for Hindus, though Louis Renou stated that "even in the most orthodox domains, the reverence to the Vedas has come to be a simple raising of the hat".

Halbfass states that, although Shaivism and Vaishnavism may be regarded as "self-contained religious constellations", there is a degree of interaction and reference between the "theoreticians and literary representatives" of each tradition that indicates the presence of "a wider sense of identity, a sense of coherence in a shared context and of inclusion in a common framework and horizon".

Classical Hinduism 
Brahmins played an essential role in the development of the post-Vedic Hindu synthesis, disseminating Vedic culture to local communities, and integrating local religiosity into the trans-regional Brahmanic culture. In the post-Gupta period Vedanta developed in southern India, where orthodox Brahmanic culture and the Hindu culture were preserved, building on ancient Vedic traditions while "accommoda[ting] the multiple demands of Hinduism."

Medieval developments 
The notion of common denominators for several religions and traditions of India further developed from the 12th century CE. Lorenzen traces the emergence of a "family resemblance", and what he calls as "beginnings of medieval and modern Hinduism" taking shape, at c. 300–600 CE, with the development of the early Puranas, and continuities with the earlier Vedic religion. Lorenzen states that the establishment of a Hindu self-identity took place "through a process of mutual self-definition with a contrasting Muslim Other". According to Lorenzen, this "presence of the Other" is necessary to recognise the "loose family resemblance" among the various traditions and schools.

According to the Indologist Alexis Sanderson, before Islam arrived in India, the "Sanskrit sources differentiated Vaidika, Vaiṣṇava, Śaiva, Śākta, Saura, Buddhist, and Jaina traditions, but they had no name that denotes the first five of these as a collective entity over and against Buddhism and Jainism". This absence of a formal name, states Sanderson, does not mean that the corresponding concept of Hinduism did not exist. By late 1st-millennium CE, the concept of a belief and tradition distinct from Buddhism and Jainism had emerged. This complex tradition accepted in its identity almost all of what is currently Hinduism, except certain antinomian tantric movements. Some conservative thinkers of those times questioned whether certain Shaiva, Vaishnava and Shakta texts or practices were consistent with the Vedas, or were invalid in their entirety. Moderates then, and most orthoprax scholars later, agreed that though there are some variations, the foundation of their beliefs, the ritual grammar, the spiritual premises, and the soteriologies were the same. "This sense of greater unity", states Sanderson, "came to be called Hinduism".

According to Nicholson, already between the 12th and the 16th centuries "certain thinkers began to treat as a single whole the diverse philosophical teachings of the Upanishads, epics, Puranas, and the schools known retrospectively as the 'six systems' (saddarsana) of mainstream Hindu philosophy." The tendency of "a blurring of philosophical distinctions" has also been noted by Mikel Burley. Hacker called this "inclusivism" and Michaels speaks of "the identificatory habit". Lorenzen locates the origins of a distinct Hindu identity in the interaction between Muslims and Hindus, and a process of "mutual self-definition with a contrasting Muslim other", which started well before 1800. Michaels notes:

Colonial period and neo-Vedanta 

This inclusivism was further developed in the 19th and 20th centuries by Hindu reform movements and Neo-Vedanta, and has become characteristic of modern Hinduism.

The notion and reports on "Hinduism" as a "single world religious tradition" was also popularised by 19th-century proselytizing missionaries and European Indologists, roles sometimes served by the same person, who relied on texts preserved by Brahmins (priests) for their information of Indian religions, and animist observations that the missionary Orientalists presumed was Hinduism. These reports influenced perceptions about Hinduism. Scholars such as Pennington state that the colonial polemical reports led to fabricated stereotypes where Hinduism was mere mystic paganism devoted to the service of devils, while other scholars state that the colonial constructions influenced the belief that the Vedas, Bhagavad Gita, Manusmriti and such texts were the essence of Hindu religiosity, and in the modern association of 'Hindu doctrine' with the schools of Vedanta (in particular Advaita Vedanta) as a paradigmatic example of Hinduism's mystical nature". Pennington, while concurring that the study of Hinduism as a world religion began in the colonial era, disagrees that Hinduism is a colonial European era invention. He states that the shared theology, common ritual grammar and way of life of those who identify themselves as Hindus is traceable to ancient times.

Modern India and the world 

The Hindutva movement has extensively argued for the unity of Hinduism, dismissing the differences and regarding India as a Hindu-country since ancient times. And there are assumptions of political dominance of Hindu nationalism in India, also known as 'Neo-Hindutva'. There have also been increase in pre-dominance of Hindutva in Nepal, similar to that of India. The scope of Hinduism is also increasing in the other parts of the world, due to the cultural influences such as Yoga and Hare Krishna movement by many missionaries organisations, especially by Iskcon and this is also due to the migration of Indian Hindus to the other nations of the world. Hinduism is growing fast in many western nations and in some African nations.

Beliefs 

Prominent themes in Hindu beliefs include (but are not restricted to) Dharma (ethics/duties),  (the continuing cycle of entanglement in passions and the resulting birth, life, death, and rebirth), Karma (action, intent, and consequences), moksha (liberation from attachment and saṃsāra), and the various yogas (paths or practices). However, not all of these themes are found among the various different systems of Hindu beliefs. Beliefs in moksha or saṃsāra are absent in certain Hindu beliefs, and were also absent among early forms of Hinduism, which was characterized by a belief in an Afterlife, with traces of this still being found among various Hindu beliefs, such as Śrāddha. Ancestor worship once formed an integral part of Hindu beliefs and is today still found as important element in various Folk Hindu streams.

Purusharthas 

Purusharthas refers to the objectives of human life. Classical Hindu thought accepts four proper goals or aims of human life, known as Puruṣārthas:
 Dharma
 Artha
 Kama
 Moksha

Dharma (righteousness, ethics) 

Dharma is considered the foremost goal of a human being in Hinduism. The concept of dharma includes behaviors that are considered to be in accord with rta, the order that makes life and universe possible, and includes duties, rights, laws, conduct, virtues and "right way of living". Hindu dharma includes the religious duties, moral rights and duties of each individual, as well as behaviors that enable social order, right conduct, and those that are virtuous. Dharma, according to Van Buitenen, is that which all existing beings must accept and respect to sustain harmony and order in the world. It is, states Van Buitenen, the pursuit and execution of one's nature and true calling, thus playing one's role in cosmic concert. The Brihadaranyaka Upanishad states it as:

In the Mahabharata, Krishna defines dharma as upholding both this-worldly and other-worldly affairs. (Mbh 12.110.11). The word Sanātana means eternal, perennial, or forever; thus, Sanātana Dharma signifies that it is the dharma that has neither beginning nor end.

Artha (livelihood, wealth) 

Artha is objective and virtuous pursuit of wealth for livelihood, obligations, and economic prosperity. It is inclusive of political life, diplomacy, and material well-being. The artha concept includes all "means of life", activities and resources that enables one to be in a state one wants to be in, wealth, career and financial security. The proper pursuit of artha is considered an important aim of human life in Hinduism.

Kāma (sensual pleasure) 

Kāma (Sanskrit, Pali: काम) means desire, wish, passion, longing, pleasure of the senses, the aesthetic enjoyment of life, affection, or love, with or without sexual connotations. In Hinduism, kama is considered an essential and healthy goal of human life when pursued without sacrificing dharma, artha and moksha.

Mokṣa (liberation, freedom from saṃsāra) 

Moksha or mukti is the ultimate, most important goal in Hinduism. In one sense, moksha is a concept associated with liberation from sorrow, suffering and saṃsāra (birth-rebirth cycle). A release from this eschatological cycle, in after life, particularly in theistic schools of Hinduism is called moksha. Due to belief in the indestructibility of Atman c.q. purusha, death is deemed insignificant with respect to the cosmic Self.

The meaning of moksha differs among the various Hindu schools of thought. For example, Advaita Vedanta holds that after attaining moksha a person knows their essence, Self as pure consciousness or the witness-consciousness and identifies it as identical to Brahman. The followers of Dvaita (dualistic) schools, in moksha state, identify individual essence as distinct from Brahman but infinitesimally close, and after attaining moksha expect to spend eternity in a loka (heaven). To theistic schools of Hinduism, moksha is liberation from saṃsāra, while for other schools such as the monistic school, moksha is possible in current life and is a psychological concept. According to Deutsch, moksha is transcendental consciousness to the latter, the perfect state of being, of self-realization, of freedom and of "realizing the whole universe as the Self". Moksha in these schools of Hinduism, suggests Klaus Klostermaier, implies a setting free of hitherto fettered faculties, a removing of obstacles to an unrestricted life, permitting a person to be more truly a person in the full sense; the concept presumes an unused human potential of creativity, compassion and understanding which had been blocked and shut out. Moksha is more than liberation from life-rebirth cycle of suffering (saṃsāra); Vedantic school separates this into two:Jivanmukti (liberation in this life) and Videhamukti (liberation after death).

Karma and saṃsāra 

Karma translates literally as action, work, or deed, and also refers to a Vedic theory of "moral law of cause and effect". The theory is a combination of (1) causality that may be ethical or non-ethical; (2) ethicization, that is good or bad actions have consequences; and (3) rebirth. Karma theory is interpreted as explaining the present circumstances of an individual with reference to his or her actions in the past. These actions and their consequences may be in a person's current life, or, according to some schools of Hinduism, in past lives. This cycle of birth, life, death and rebirth is called saṃsāra. Liberation from saṃsāra through moksha is believed to ensure lasting happiness and peace. Hindu scriptures teach that the future is both a function of current human effort derived from free will and past human actions that set the circumstances. The idea of reincarnation, or saṃsāra, is not mentioned in the early layers of historical Hindu texts such as the Rigveda. The later layers of the Rigveda do mention ideas that suggest an approach towards the idea of rebirth, according to Ranade. According to Sayers, these earliest layers of Hindu literature show ancestor worship and rites such as sraddha (offering food to the ancestors). The later Vedic texts such as the Aranyakas and the Upanisads show a different soteriology based on reincarnation, they show little concern with ancestor rites, and they begin to philosophically interpret the earlier rituals. The idea of reincarnation and karma have roots in the Upanishads of the late Vedic period, predating the Buddha and the Mahavira.

Concept of God 

Hinduism is a diverse system of thought with a wide variety of beliefs; its concept of God is complex and depends upon each individual and the tradition and philosophy followed. It is sometimes referred to as henotheistic (i.e., involving devotion to a single god while accepting the existence of others), but any such term is an overgeneralization.

The Nasadiya Sukta (Creation Hymn) of the Rig Veda is one of the earliest texts which "demonstrates a sense of metaphysical speculation" about what created the universe, the concept of god(s) and The One, and whether even The One knows how the universe came into being. The Rig Veda praises various deities, none superior nor inferior, in a henotheistic manner. The hymns repeatedly refer to One Truth and One Ultimate Reality. The "One Truth" of Vedic literature, in modern era scholarship, has been interpreted as monotheism, monism, as well as a deified Hidden Principles behind the great happenings and processes of nature.

Hindus believe that all living creatures have a Self. This true "Self" of every person, is called the ātman. The Self is believed to be eternal. According to the monistic/pantheistic (non-dualist) theologies of Hinduism (such as Advaita Vedanta school), this Atman is indistinct from Brahman, the supreme spirit or the Ultimate Reality. The goal of life, according to the Advaita school, is to realise that one's Self is identical to supreme Self, that the supreme Self is present in everything and everyone, all life is interconnected and there is oneness in all life. Dualistic schools (Dvaita and Bhakti) understand Brahman as a Supreme Being separate from individual Selfs. They worship the Supreme Being variously as Vishnu, Brahma, Shiva, or Shakti, depending upon the sect. God is called Ishvara, Bhagavan, Parameshwara, Deva or Devi, and these terms have different meanings in different schools of Hinduism.

Hindu texts accept a polytheistic framework, but this is generally conceptualized as the divine essence or luminosity that gives vitality and animation to the inanimate natural substances. There is a divine in everything, human beings, animals, trees and rivers. It is observable in offerings to rivers, trees, tools of one's work, animals and birds, rising sun, friends and guests, teachers and parents. It is the divine in these that makes each sacred and worthy of reverence, rather than them being sacred in and of themselves. This perception of divinity manifested in all things, as Buttimer and Wallin view it, makes the Vedic foundations of Hinduism quite distinct from animism, in which all things are themselves divine. The animistic premise sees multiplicity, and therefore an equality of ability to compete for power when it comes to man and man, man and animal, man and nature, etc. The Vedic view does not perceive this competition, equality of man to nature, or multiplicity so much as an overwhelming and interconnecting single divinity that unifies everyone and everything.

The devas are an integral part of Hindu culture and are depicted in art, architecture and through icons, and stories about them are related in the scriptures, particularly in Indian epic poetry and the Puranas. They are, however, often distinguished from Ishvara, a personal god, with many Hindus worshipping Ishvara in one of its particular manifestations as their , or chosen ideal. The choice is a matter of individual preference, and of regional and family traditions. The multitude of Devas are considered manifestations of Brahman.

The word avatar does not appear in the Vedic literature, but appears in verb forms in post-Vedic literature, and as a noun particularly in the Puranic literature after the 6th century CE. Theologically, the reincarnation idea is most often associated with the avatars of Hindu god Vishnu, though the idea has been applied to other deities. Varying lists of avatars of Vishnu appear in Hindu scriptures, including the ten Dashavatara of the Garuda Purana and the twenty-two avatars in the Bhagavata Purana, though the latter adds that the incarnations of Vishnu are innumerable. The avatars of Vishnu are important in Vaishnavism theology. In the goddess-based Shaktism tradition, avatars of the Devi are found and all goddesses are considered to be different aspects of the same metaphysical Brahman and Shakti (energy). While avatars of other deities such as Ganesha and Shiva are also mentioned in medieval Hindu texts, this is minor and occasional.

Both theistic and atheistic ideas, for epistemological and metaphysical reasons, are profuse in different schools of Hinduism. The early Nyaya school of Hinduism, for example, was non-theist/atheist, but later Nyaya school scholars argued that God exists and offered proofs using its theory of logic. Other schools disagreed with Nyaya scholars. Samkhya, Mimamsa and Carvaka schools of Hinduism, were non-theist/atheist, arguing that "God was an unnecessary metaphysical assumption". Its Vaisheshika school started as another non-theistic tradition relying on naturalism and that all matter is eternal, but it later introduced the concept of a non-creator God. The Yoga school of Hinduism accepted the concept of a "personal god" and left it to the Hindu to define his or her god. Advaita Vedanta taught a monistic, abstract Self and Oneness in everything, with no room for gods or deity, a perspective that Mohanty calls, "spiritual, not religious". Bhakti sub-schools of Vedanta taught a creator God that is distinct from each human being.

God in Hinduism is often represented, having both the feminine and masculine aspects. The notion of the feminine in deity is much more pronounced and is evident in the pairings of Shiva with Parvati (Ardhanarishvara), Vishnu accompanied by Lakshmi, Radha with Krishna and Sita with Rama.

According to Graham Schweig, Hinduism has the strongest presence of the divine feminine in world religion from ancient times to the present. The goddess is viewed as the heart of the most esoteric Saiva traditions.

Authority 

Authority and eternal truths play an important role in Hinduism. Religious traditions and truths are believed to be contained in its sacred texts, which are accessed and taught by sages, gurus, saints or avatars. But there is also a strong tradition of the questioning of authority, internal debate and challenging of religious texts in Hinduism. The Hindus believe that this deepens the understanding of the eternal truths and further develops the tradition. Authority "was mediated through [...] an intellectual culture that tended to develop ideas collaboratively, and according to the shared logic of natural reason." Narratives in the Upanishads present characters questioning persons of authority. The Kena Upanishad repeatedly asks kena, 'by what' power something is the case. The Katha Upanishad and Bhagavad Gita present narratives where the student criticizes the teacher's inferior answers. In the Shiva Purana, Shiva questions Vishnu and Brahma. Doubt plays a repeated role in the Mahabharata. Jayadeva's Gita Govinda presents criticism via the character of Radha.

Main traditions

Denominations 

Hinduism has no central doctrinal authority and many practising Hindus do not claim to belong to any particular denomination or tradition. Four major denominations are, however, used in scholarly studies: Shaivism, Shaktism, Smartism and Vaishnavism. Vaishnavites are by far the large majority of Hindus, with the second large community being the Shaivites. These denominations differ primarily in the central deity worshipped, the traditions and the soteriological outlook. The denominations of Hinduism, states Lipner, are unlike those found in major religions of the world, because Hindu denominations are fuzzy with individuals practicing more than one, and he suggests the term "Hindu polycentrism".

Vaishnavism is the devotional religious tradition that worships Vishnu and his avatars, particularly Krishna and Rama. The adherents of this sect are generally non-ascetic, monastic, oriented towards community events and devotionalism practices inspired by "intimate loving, joyous, playful" Krishna and other Vishnu avatars. These practices sometimes include community dancing, singing of Kirtans and Bhajans, with sound and music believed by some to have meditative and spiritual powers. Temple worship and festivals are typically elaborate in Vaishnavism. The Bhagavad Gita and the Ramayana, along with Vishnu-oriented Puranas provide its theistic foundations. Philosophically, their beliefs are rooted in the dualism sub-schools of Vedantic Hinduism.

Shaivism is the tradition that focuses on Shiva. Shaivas are more attracted to ascetic individualism, and it has several sub-schools. Their practices include bhakti-style devotionalism, yet their beliefs lean towards nondual, monistic schools of Hinduism such as Advaita and Raja Yoga. Some Shaivas worship in temples, while others emphasize yoga, striving to be one with Shiva within. Avatars are uncommon, and some Shaivas visualize god as half male, half female, as a fusion of the male and female principles (Ardhanarishvara). Shaivism is related to Shaktism, wherein Shakti is seen as spouse of Shiva. Community celebrations include festivals, and participation, with Vaishnavas, in pilgrimages such as the Kumbh Mela. Shaivism has been more commonly practiced in the Himalayan north from Kashmir to Nepal, and in south India.

Shaktism focuses on goddess worship of Shakti or Devi as cosmic mother, and it is particularly common in northeastern and eastern states of India such as Assam and Bengal. Devi is depicted as in gentler forms like Parvati, the consort of Shiva; or, as fierce warrior goddesses like Kali and Durga. Followers of Shaktism recognize Shakti as the power that underlies the male principle. Shaktism is also associated with Tantra practices. Community celebrations include festivals, some of which include processions and idol immersion into sea or other water bodies.

Smartism centers its worship simultaneously on all the major Hindu deities: Shiva, Vishnu, Shakti, Ganesha, Surya and Skanda. The Smarta tradition developed during the (early) Classical Period of Hinduism around the beginning of the Common Era, when Hinduism emerged from the interaction between Brahmanism and local traditions. The Smarta tradition is aligned with Advaita Vedanta, and regards Adi Shankara as its founder or reformer, who considered worship of God-with-attributes (Saguna Brahman) as a journey towards ultimately realizing God-without-attributes (nirguna Brahman, Atman, Self-knowledge). The term Smartism is derived from Smriti texts of Hinduism, meaning those who remember the traditions in the texts. This Hindu sect practices a philosophical Jnana yoga, scriptural studies, reflection, meditative path seeking an understanding of Self's oneness with God.

There are no census data available on demographic history or trends for the traditions within Hinduism. Estimates vary on the relative number of adherents in the different traditions of Hinduism. According to a 2010 estimate by Johnson and Grim, the Vaishnavism tradition is the largest group with about 641 million or 67.6% of Hindus, followed by Shaivism with 252 million or 26.6%, Shaktism with 30 million or 3.2% and other traditions including Neo-Hinduism and Reform Hinduism with 25 million or 2.6%. In contrast, according to Jones and Ryan, Shaivism is the largest tradition of Hinduism.

Ethnicities 

Hinduism is traditionally a multi- or polyethnic religion. On the Indian subcontinent, it is widespread among many Indo-Aryan, Dravidian and other South Asian ethnic groups, for example, the Meitei people (Tibeto-Burman ethnicity in the northeastern Indian state Manipur).

In addition, in antiquity and the Middle Ages, Hinduism was the state religion in many Indianized kingdoms of Asia, the Greater Indiafrom Afghanistan (Kabul) in the West and including almost all of Southeast Asia in the East (Cambodia, Vietnam, Indonesia, partly Philippines)and only by 15th century was nearly everywhere supplanted by Buddhism and Islam, except several still Hindu minor Austronesian ethnic groups, such as the Balinese and Tenggerese people in Indonesia, and the Chams in Vietnam. Also, a small community of the Afghan Pashtuns who migrated to India after partition remain committed to Hinduism.

There are many new ethnic Ghanaian Hindus in Ghana, who have converted to Hinduism due to the works of Swami Ghanananda Saraswati and Hindu Monastery of Africa From the beginning of the 20th century, by the forces of Baba Premananda Bharati (1858–1914), Swami Vivekananda, A. C. Bhaktivedanta Swami Prabhupada and other missionaries, Hinduism gained a certain distribution among the Western peoples.

Scriptures 

The ancient scriptures of Hinduism are in Sanskrit. These texts are classified into two: Shruti and Smriti. Shruti is apauruṣeyā, "not made of a man" but revealed to the rishis (seers), and regarded as having the highest authority, while the smriti are manmade and have secondary authority. They are the two highest sources of dharma, the other two being Śiṣṭa Āchāra/Sadāchara (conduct of noble people) and finally Ātma tuṣṭi ("what is pleasing to oneself")

Hindu scriptures were composed, memorized and transmitted verbally, across generations, for many centuries before they were written down. Over many centuries, sages refined the teachings and expanded the Shruti and Smriti, as well as developed Shastras with epistemological and metaphysical theories of six classical schools of Hinduism.

Shruti (lit. that which is heard) primarily refers to the Vedas, which form the earliest record of the Hindu scriptures, and are regarded as eternal truths revealed to the ancient sages (rishis). There are four Vedas – Rigveda, Samaveda, Yajurveda and Atharvaveda. Each Veda has been subclassified into four major text types – the Samhitas (mantras and benedictions), the Aranyakas (text on rituals, ceremonies, sacrifices and symbolic-sacrifices), the Brahmanas (commentaries on rituals, ceremonies and sacrifices), and the Upanishads (text discussing meditation, philosophy and spiritual knowledge).

The Upanishads are the foundation of Hindu philosophical thought, and have profoundly influenced diverse traditions. Of the Shrutis (Vedic corpus), they alone are widely influential among Hindus, considered scriptures par excellence of Hinduism, and their central ideas have continued to influence its thoughts and traditions. Sarvepalli Radhakrishnan states that the Upanishads have played a dominating role ever since their appearance. There are 108 Muktikā Upanishads in Hinduism, of which between 10 and 13 are variously counted by scholars as Principal Upanishads.

The most notable of the Smritis ("remembered") are the Hindu epics and the Puranas. The epics consist of the Mahabharata and the Ramayana. The Bhagavad Gita is an integral part of the Mahabharata and one of the most popular sacred texts of Hinduism. It is sometimes called Gitopanishad, then placed in the Shruti ("heard") category, being Upanishadic in content. The Puranas, which started to be composed from c. 300 CE onward, contain extensive mythologies, and are central in the distribution of common themes of Hinduism through vivid narratives. The Yoga Sutras is a classical text for the Hindu Yoga tradition, which gained a renewed popularity in the 20th century.

Since the 19th-century Indian modernists have re-asserted the 'Aryan origins' of Hinduism, "purifying" Hinduism from its Tantric elements and elevating the Vedic elements. Hindu modernists like Vivekananda see the Vedas as the laws of the spiritual world, which would still exist even if they were not revealed to the sages. In Tantric tradition, the Agamas refer to authoritative scriptures or the teachings of Shiva to Shakti, while Nigamas refers to the Vedas and the teachings of Shakti to Shiva. In Agamic schools of Hinduism, the Vedic literature and the Agamas are equally authoritative.

Practices

Rituals 

Most Hindus observe religious rituals at home. The rituals vary greatly among regions, villages, and individuals. They are not mandatory in Hinduism. The nature and place of rituals is an individual's choice. Some devout Hindus perform daily rituals such as worshiping at dawn after bathing (usually at a family shrine, and typically includes lighting a lamp and offering foodstuffs before the images of deities), recitation from religious scripts, singing bhajans (devotional hymns), yoga, meditation, chanting mantras and others.

Vedic rituals of fire-oblation (yajna) and chanting of Vedic hymns are observed on special occasions, such as a Hindu wedding. Other major life-stage events, such as rituals after death, include the yajña and chanting of Vedic mantras.

The words of the mantras are "themselves sacred," and "do not constitute linguistic utterances." Instead, as Klostermaier notes, in their application in Vedic rituals they become magical sounds, "means to an end." In the Brahmanical perspective, the sounds have their own meaning, mantras are considered "primordial rhythms of creation", preceding the forms to which they refer. By reciting them the cosmos is regenerated, "by enlivening and nourishing the forms of creation at their base. As long as the purity of the sounds is preserved, the recitation of the mantras will be efficacious, irrespective of whether their discursive meaning is understood by human beings."

Sādhanā 

Sādhanā is derived from the root "sādh-", meaning "to accomplish," and denotes a means for the realization of spiritual goals. Although different denominations of Hinduism have their own particular notions of sādhana, they share the feature of liberation from bondage. They differ on what causes bondage, how one can become free of that bondage, and who or what can lead one on that path.

Life-cycle rites of passage 

Major life stage milestones are celebrated as sanskara (saṃskāra, rites of passage) in Hinduism. The rites of passage are not mandatory, and vary in details by gender, community and regionally. Gautama Dharmasutras composed in about the middle of 1st millennium BCE lists 48 sanskaras, while Gryhasutra and other texts composed centuries later list between 12 and 16 sanskaras. The list of sanskaras in Hinduism include both external rituals such as those marking a baby's birth and a baby's name giving ceremony, as well as inner rites of resolutions and ethics such as compassion towards all living beings and positive attitude.

The major traditional rites of passage in Hinduism include Garbhadhana (pregnancy), Pumsavana (rite before the fetus begins moving and kicking in womb), Simantonnayana (parting of pregnant woman's hair, baby shower), Jatakarman (rite celebrating the new born baby), Namakarana (naming the child), Nishkramana (baby's first outing from home into the world), Annaprashana (baby's first feeding of solid food), Chudakarana (baby's first haircut, tonsure), Karnavedha (ear piercing), Vidyarambha (baby's start with knowledge), Upanayana (entry into a school rite), Keshanta and Ritusuddhi (first shave for boys, menarche for girls), Samavartana (graduation ceremony), Vivaha (wedding), Vratas (fasting, spiritual studies) and Antyeshti (cremation for an adult, burial for a child). In contemporary times, there is regional variation among Hindus as to which of these sanskaras are observed; in some cases, additional regional rites of passage such as Śrāddha (ritual of feeding people after cremation) are practiced.

Bhakti (worship) 

Bhakti refers to devotion, participation in and the love of a personal god or a representational god by a devotee. Bhakti-marga is considered in Hinduism to be one of many possible paths of spirituality and alternative means to moksha. The other paths, left to the choice of a Hindu, are Jnana-marga (path of knowledge), Karma-marga (path of works), Rāja-marga (path of contemplation and meditation).

Bhakti is practiced in a number of ways, ranging from reciting mantras, japas (incantations), to individual private prayers in one's home shrine, or in a temple before a murti or sacred image of a deity. Hindu temples and domestic altars, are important elements of worship in contemporary theistic Hinduism. While many visit a temple on special occasions, most offer daily prayers at a domestic altar, typically a dedicated part of the home that includes sacred images of deities or gurus.

One form of daily worship is aarti, or "supplication," a ritual in which a flame is offered and "accompanied by a song of praise". Notable aartis include Om Jai Jagdish Hare, a Hindi prayer to Vishnu, and Sukhakarta Dukhaharta, a Marathi prayer to Ganesha. Aarti can be used to make offerings to entities ranging from deities to "human exemplar[s]". For instance, Aarti is offered to Hanuman, a devotee of God, in many temples, including Balaji temples, where the primary deity is an incarnation of Vishnu. In Swaminarayan temples and home shrines, aarti is offered to Swaminarayan, considered by followers to be supreme God.

Other personal and community practices include puja as well as aarti, kirtan, or bhajan, where devotional verses and hymns are read or poems are sung by a group of devotees. While the choice of the deity is at the discretion of the Hindu, the most observed traditions of Hindu devotion include Vaishnavism, Shaivism, and Shaktism. A Hindu may worship multiple deities, all as henotheistic manifestations of the same ultimate reality, cosmic spirit and absolute spiritual concept called Brahman. Bhakti-marga, states Pechelis, is more than ritual devotionalism, it includes practices and spiritual activities aimed at refining one's state of mind, knowing god, participating in god, and internalizing god. While bhakti practices are popular and easily observable aspect of Hinduism, not all Hindus practice bhakti, or believe in god-with-attributes (saguna Brahman). Concurrent Hindu practices include a belief in god-without-attributes (nirguna Brahman), and god within oneself.

Festivals 

Hindu festivals (Sanskrit: Utsava; literally: "to lift higher") are ceremonies that weave individual and social life to dharma. Hinduism has many festivals throughout the year, where the dates are set by the lunisolar Hindu calendar, many coinciding with either the full moon (Holi) or the new moon (Diwali), often with seasonal changes. Some festivals are found only regionally and they celebrate local traditions, while a few such as Holi and Diwali are pan-Hindu.
The festivals typically celebrate events from Hinduism, connoting spiritual themes and celebrating aspects of human relationships such as the sister-brother bond over the Raksha Bandhan (or Bhai Dooj) festival. The same festival sometimes marks different stories depending on the Hindu denomination, and the celebrations incorporate regional themes, traditional agriculture, local arts, family get togethers, Puja rituals and feasts.

Some major regional or pan-Hindu festivals include:

 Makar Sankranti
 Pongal
 Thaipusam
 Vasant Panchami
 Maha Shivaratri
 Shigmo
 Holi
 Gudi Padwa
 Ugadi
 Vishu
 Ram Navami
 Kartik Purnima
 Raksha Bandhan
 Krishna Janmastami
 Gowri Habba
 Ganesh Chaturthi
 Onam
 Navaratri
 Dussehra
 Durga Puja
 Diwali or Tihar or Deepawali
 Chhath
 Ashadhi Ekadashi
 Bonalu
 Rath Yatra
 Dashain
 Karva Chauth

Pilgrimage 

Many adherents undertake pilgrimages, which have historically been an important part of Hinduism and remain so today. Pilgrimage sites are called Tirtha, Kshetra, Gopitha or Mahalaya. The process or journey associated with Tirtha is called Tirtha-yatra. According to the Hindu text Skanda Purana, Tirtha are of three kinds: Jangam Tirtha is to a place movable of a sadhu, a rishi, a guru; Sthawar Tirtha is to a place immovable, like Benaras, Haridwar, Mount Kailash, holy rivers; while Manas Tirtha is to a place of mind of truth, charity, patience, compassion, soft speech, Self. Tīrtha-yatra is, states Knut A. Jacobsen, anything that has a salvific value to a Hindu, and includes pilgrimage sites such as mountains or forests or seashore or rivers or ponds, as well as virtues, actions, studies or state of mind.

Pilgrimage sites of Hinduism are mentioned in the epic Mahabharata and the Puranas. Most Puranas include large sections on Tirtha Mahatmya along with tourist guides, which describe sacred sites and places to visit. In these texts, Varanasi (Benares, Kashi), Rameswaram, Kanchipuram, Dwarka, Puri, Haridwar, Sri Rangam, Vrindavan, Ayodhya, Tirupati, Mayapur, Nathdwara, twelve Jyotirlinga and Shakti Pitha have been mentioned as particularly holy sites, along with geographies where major rivers meet (sangam) or join the sea. Kumbh Mela is another major pilgrimage on the eve of the solar festival Makar Sankranti. This pilgrimage rotates at a gap of three years among four sites: Prayag Raj at the confluence of the Ganges and Yamuna rivers, Haridwar near source of the Ganges, Ujjain on the Shipra river and Nashik on the bank of the Godavari river. This is one of world's largest mass pilgrimage, with an estimated 40 to 100 million people attending the event. At this event, they say a prayer to the sun and bathe in the river, a tradition attributed to Adi Shankara.

Some pilgrimages are part of a Vrata (vow), which a Hindu may make for a number of reasons. It may mark a special occasion, such as the birth of a baby, or as part of a rite of passage such as a baby's first haircut, or after healing from a sickness. It may, states Eck, also be the result of prayers answered. An alternative reason for Tirtha, for some Hindus, is to respect wishes or in memory of a beloved person after his or her death. This may include dispersing their cremation ashes in a Tirtha region in a stream, river or sea to honor the wishes of the dead. The journey to a Tirtha, assert some Hindu texts, helps one overcome the sorrow of the loss.

Other reasons for a Tirtha in Hinduism is to rejuvenate or gain spiritual merit by traveling to famed temples or bathe in rivers such as the Ganges. Tirtha has been one of the recommended means of addressing remorse and to perform penance, for unintentional errors and intentional sins, in the Hindu tradition. The proper procedure for a pilgrimage is widely discussed in Hindu texts. The most accepted view is that the greatest austerity comes from traveling on foot, or part of the journey is on foot, and that the use of a conveyance is only acceptable if the pilgrimage is otherwise impossible.

Culture 
The term "Hindu culture" refers to mean aspects of culture that pertain to the religion, such as festivals and dress codes followed by the Hindus which is mainly can be inspired from the culture of India and Southeast Asia. Though there has been a mixture of different culture in Hinduism and has also influenced the cultures of many nations, mainly of the part of Greater India.

Architecture

Art

Calendar

Person and society

Varnas 

Hindu society has been categorised into four classes, called varṇas. They are the Brahmins: Vedic teachers and priests; the Kshatriyas: warriors and kings; the Vaishyas: farmers and merchants; and the Shudras: servants and labourers.
The Bhagavad Gītā links the varṇa to an individual's duty (svadharma), inborn nature (svabhāva), and natural tendencies (guṇa). The Manusmriti categorises the different castes.
Some mobility and flexibility within the varṇas challenge allegations of social discrimination in the caste system, as has been pointed out by several sociologists, although some other scholars disagree. Scholars debate whether the so-called caste system is part of Hinduism sanctioned by the scriptures or social custom. And various contemporary scholars have argued that the caste system was constructed by the British colonial regime.

A renunciant man of knowledge is usually called Varṇatita or "beyond all varṇas" in Vedantic works. The bhiksu is advised to not bother about the caste of the family from which he begs his food. Scholars like Adi Sankara affirm that not only is Brahman beyond all varṇas, the man who is identified with Him also transcends the distinctions and limitations of caste.

Yoga 

In whatever way a Hindu defines the goal of life, there are several methods (yogas) that sages have taught for reaching that goal. Yoga is a Hindu discipline which trains the body, mind, and consciousness for health, tranquility, and spiritual insight. Texts dedicated to yoga include the Yoga Sutras, the Hatha Yoga Pradipika, the Bhagavad Gita and, as their philosophical and historical basis, the Upanishads. Yoga is means, and the four major marga (paths) of Hinduism are: Bhakti Yoga (the path of love and devotion), Karma Yoga (the path of right action), Rāja Yoga (the path of meditation), and Jñāna Yoga (the path of wisdom) An individual may prefer one or some yogas over others, according to his or her inclination and understanding. Practice of one yoga does not exclude others. The modern practice of yoga as exercise (traditionally Hatha yoga) has a contested relationship with Hinduism.

Symbolism 

Hinduism has a developed system of symbolism and iconography to represent the sacred in art, architecture, literature and worship. These symbols gain their meaning from the scriptures or cultural traditions. The syllable Om (which represents the Brahman and Atman) has grown to represent Hinduism itself, while other markings such as the Swastika sign represent auspiciousness, and Tilaka (literally, seed) on forehead – considered to be the location of spiritual third eye, marks ceremonious welcome, blessing or one's participation in a ritual or rite of passage. Elaborate Tilaka with lines may also identify a devotee of a particular denomination. Flowers, birds, animals, instruments, symmetric mandala drawings, objects, lingam, idols are all part of symbolic iconography in Hinduism.

Ahiṃsā and food customs 

Estimates of strict lacto vegetarians in India (includes adherents of all religions) who never eat any meat, fish or eggs vary between 20% and 42%, while others are either less strict vegetarians or non-vegetarians. Those who eat meat seek Jhatka (quick death) method of meat production, and dislike Halal (slow bled death) method, believing that quick death method reduces suffering to the animal. The food habits vary with region, with Bengali Hindus and Hindus living in Himalayan regions, or river delta regions, regularly eating meat and fish. Some avoid meat on specific festivals or occasions. Observant Hindus who do eat meat almost always abstain from beef. Hinduism specifically considers Bos indicus to be sacred. The cow in Hindu society is traditionally identified as a caretaker and a maternal figure, and Hindu society honours the cow as a symbol of unselfish giving, selfless sacrifice, gentleness and tolerance.
There are many Hindu groups that have continued to abide by a strict vegetarian diet in modern times. Some adhere to a diet that is devoid of meat, eggs, and seafood. Food affects body, mind and spirit in Hindu beliefs. Hindu texts such as Śāṇḍilya Upanishad and Svātmārāma recommend Mitahara (eating in moderation) as one of the Yamas (virtuous Self restraints). The Bhagavad Gita links body and mind to food one consumes in verses 17.8 through 17.10.

Some Hindus such as those belonging to the Shaktism tradition, and Hindus in regions such as Bali and Nepal practise animal sacrifice. The sacrificed animal is eaten as ritual food. In contrast, the Vaishnava Hindus abhor and vigorously oppose animal sacrifice. The principle of non-violence to animals has been so thoroughly adopted in Hinduism that animal sacrifice is uncommon and historically reduced to a vestigial marginal practice.

Institutions

Temple 

A Hindu temple is a house of god(s). It is a space and structure designed to bring human beings and gods together, infused with symbolism to express the ideas and beliefs of Hinduism. A temple incorporates all elements of Hindu cosmology, the highest spire or dome representing Mount Meru – reminder of the abode of Brahma and the center of spiritual universe, the carvings and iconography symbolically presenting dharma, kama, artha, moksha and karma. The layout, the motifs, the plan and the building process recite ancient rituals, geometric symbolisms, and reflect beliefs and values innate within various schools of Hinduism. Hindu temples are spiritual destinations for many Hindus (not all), as well as landmarks for arts, annual festivals, rite of passage rituals, and community celebrations.

Hindu temples come in many styles, diverse locations, deploy different construction methods and are adapted to different deities and regional beliefs. Two major styles of Hindu temples include the Gopuram style found in south India, and Nagara style found in north India. Other styles include cave, forest and mountain temples. Yet, despite their differences, almost all Hindu temples share certain common architectural principles, core ideas, symbolism and themes.

Many temples feature one or more idols (murtis). The idol and Grabhgriya in the Brahma-pada (the center of the temple), under the main spire, serves as a focal point (darsana, a sight) in a Hindu temple. In larger temples, the central space typically is surrounded by an ambulatory for the devotee to walk around and ritually circumambulate the Purusa (Brahman), the universal essence.

Asrama 

Traditionally the life of a Hindu is divided into four Āśramas (phases or life stages; another meaning includes monastery). The four ashramas are: Brahmacharya (student), Grihastha (householder), Vānaprastha (retired) and Sannyasa (renunciation).
Brahmacharya represents the bachelor student stage of life. Grihastha refers to the individual's married life, with the duties of maintaining a household, raising a family, educating one's children, and leading a family-centred and a dharmic social life. Grihastha stage starts with Hindu wedding, and has been considered the most important of all stages in sociological context, as Hindus in this stage not only pursued a virtuous life, they produced food and wealth that sustained people in other stages of life, as well as the offsprings that continued mankind. Vanaprastha is the retirement stage, where a person hands over household responsibilities to the next generation, took an advisory role, and gradually withdrew from the world. The Sannyasa stage marks renunciation and a state of disinterest and detachment from material life, generally without any meaningful property or home (ascetic state), and focused on Moksha, peace and simple spiritual life.

The Ashramas system has been one facet of the dharma concept in Hinduism. Combined with four proper goals of human life (Purusartha), the Ashramas system traditionally aimed at providing a Hindu with fulfilling life and spiritual liberation. While these stages are typically sequential, any person can enter Sannyasa (ascetic) stage and become an Ascetic at any time after the Brahmacharya stage. Sannyasa is not religiously mandatory in Hinduism, and elderly people are free to live with their families.

Monasticism 

Some Hindus choose to live a monastic life (Sannyāsa) in pursuit of liberation (moksha) or another form of spiritual perfection. Monastics commit themselves to a simple and celibate life, detached from material pursuits, of meditation and spiritual contemplation. A Hindu monk is called a Sanyāsī, Sādhu, or Swāmi. A female renunciate is called a Sanyāsini. Renunciates receive high respect in Hindu society because of their simple ahiṃsā-driven lifestyle and dedication to spiritual liberation (moksha) – believed to be the ultimate goal of life in Hinduism. Some monastics live in monasteries, while others wander from place to place, depending on donated food and charity for their needs.

History 

Hinduism's varied history overlaps or coincides with the development of religion in the Indian subcontinent since the Iron Age, with some of its traditions tracing back to prehistoric religions such as those of the Bronze Age Indus Valley Civilisation. It has thus been called the "oldest religion" in the world. Scholars regard Hinduism as a synthesis of various Indian cultures and traditions, with diverse roots and no single founder.

The history of Hinduism is often divided into periods of development. The first period is the pre-Vedic period, which includes the Indus Valley Civilization and local pre-historic religions, ending at about 1750 BCE. This period was followed in northern India by the Vedic period, which saw the introduction of the historical Vedic religion with the Indo-Aryan migrations, starting somewhere between 1900 BCE to 1400 BCE. The subsequent period, between 800 BCE and 200 BCE, is "a turning point between the Vedic religion and Hindu religions", and a formative period for Hinduism, Jainism and Buddhism. The Epic and Early Puranic period, from c. 200 BCE to 500 CE, saw the classical "Golden Age" of Hinduism (c. 320-650 CE), which coincides with the Gupta Empire. In this period the six branches of Hindu philosophy evolved, namely Samkhya, Yoga, Nyaya, Vaisheshika, Mīmāṃsā, and Vedanta. Monotheistic sects like Shaivism and Vaishnavism developed during this same period through the Bhakti movement. The period from roughly 650 to 1100 CE forms the late Classical period or early Middle Ages, in which classical Puranic Hinduism is established, and Adi Shankara's influential consolidation of Advaita Vedanta.

The colonial period saw the emergence of various Hindu reform movements partly inspired by western movements, such as Unitarianism and Theosophy. Indians were hired as plantation labourers in British colonies such as Fiji, Mauritius, Trinidad and Tobago. The Partition of India in 1947 was along religious lines, with the Republic of India emerging with a Hindu majority. During the 20th century, due to the Indian diaspora, Hindu minorities have formed in all continents, with the largest communities in absolute numbers in the United States, and the United Kingdom.

In the 20th–21st century, many missionary organizations such as ISKCON, Sathya Sai Organization, Vedanta Society and so on. have been influential in spreading the core culture of Hinduism outside India. There have also been an increase of Hindu identity in politics, mostly in India, Nepal and Bangladesh in the form of Hindutva. The revivalist movement was mainly started and encouraged by many organisations like RSS, BJP and other organisations of Sangh Parivar in India, while there are also many Hindu nationalist parties and organisations such as Shivsena Nepal and RPP in Nepal, HINDRAF in Malaysia, etc. In September 2021, the State of New Jersey aligned with the World Hindu Council to declare October as Hindu Heritage Month.

Demographics 

Hinduism is a major religion in India. Hinduism was followed by around 79.8% of the country's population of 1.21 billion (2011 census) (966 million adherents). Other significant populations are found in Nepal (23 million), Bangladesh (15 million) and the Indonesian island of Bali (3.9 million). There is also a significant population of Hindus are also present in Pakistan (4 million). The majority of the Vietnamese Cham people also follow Hinduism, with the largest proportion in Ninh Thuận Province. Hinduism is the third fastest-growing religion in the world after Islam and Christianity, with a predicted growth rate of 34% between 2010 and 2050.

Countries with the greatest proportion of Hindus:
 81.3%.
 79.8%.
 48.5%.
 28.4%.
 27.9%.
 22.6%.
 22.3%.
 18.2%.
 13.8%.
 12.6%.
 9.8%.
 8.5%.
 6.8%.
 6.6%.
 6.3%.
 6%.
 5.5%.
 5%.
 3.86%.
 2.62%.
 2.4%.
 2.14%.

Demographically, Hinduism is the world's third largest religion, after Christianity and Islam.

Persecution and debates

Persecution 

Hindus have experienced both historical religious persecution, ongoing religious persecution and systematic violence. These occur in the form of forced conversions, documented massacres, demolition and desecration of temples. Historic persecutions of Hindus happened under Muslim rulers and also by Christian Missionaries. In the Mughal Period, Hindus were forced to pay the Jizya. In Goa, the 1560 inquisition by Portuguese colonists is also considered one of the most brutal persecutions of Hindus. Between 200,000 and one million people, including both Muslims and Hindus, were killed during the Partition of India. In modern times, Hindus face discrimination in many parts of the world and also face persecution and forced conversion in many countries, especially in Pakistan, Bangladesh, Fiji and others.

Conversion debate 
In the modern era, religious conversion from and to Hinduism has been a controversial subject. Some state the concept of missionary conversion, either way, is anathema to the precepts of Hinduism.

It is known that, unlike ethnic religions, which exist almost exclusively among, for instance, the Japanese (Shinto), the Chinese (Taoism), or the Jews (Judaism), Hinduism in India and Nepal is widespread among many, both Indo-Aryan and non-Aryan ethnic groups. In addition, religious conversion to Hinduism has a long history outside India. Merchants and traders of India, particularly from the Indian peninsula, carried their religious ideas, which led to religious conversions to Hinduism outside India. In antiquity and the Middle Ages, Hinduism was the state religion in many kingdoms of Asia, the so-called Greater India: from Afghanistan (Kabul) in the West and including almost all of Southeast Asia in the East (Cambodia, Vietnam, Indonesia, Philippines), and only by 15th century was nearly everywhere supplanted by Buddhism and Islam. Therefore, it looks quite natural for the modern Hindu preaching in the world.

Within India, archeological and textual evidence such as the 2nd-century BCE Heliodorus pillar suggest that Greeks and other foreigners converted to Hinduism. The debate on proselytization and religious conversion between Christianity, Islam and Hinduism is more recent, and started in the 19th century.

Religious leaders of some Hindu reform movements such as the Arya Samaj launched Shuddhi movement to proselytize and reconvert Muslims and Christians back to Hinduism, while those such as the Brahmo Samaj suggested Hinduism to be a non-missionary religion. All these sects of Hinduism have welcomed new members to their group, while other leaders of Hinduism's diverse schools have stated that given the intensive proselytization activities from missionary Islam and Christianity, this "there is no such thing as proselytism in Hinduism" view must be re-examined.

The appropriateness of conversion from major religions to Hinduism, and vice versa, has been and remains an actively debated topic in India, Nepal, and in Indonesia.

See also 

 Hinduism

 Hindu atheism
 Crypto-Hinduism
 Gautama Buddha in Hinduism
 Anti-Hindu sentiment
 Hindu eschatology
 Hinduism by country
 Indomania
 Jagran
 Lists of Hindus
 Encyclopedia of Hinduism

 Related systems and religions

 Adivasi religion
 Ayyavazhi
 Bathouism
 Donyi-Polo
 Dravidian folk religion
 Eastern religions
 Eastern philosophy
 Gurung shamanism
 Bon
 Hinduism and other religions
 Hinduism and Judaism
 Hinduism and Sikhism
 Buddhism and Hinduism
 Hinduism and Theosophy
 Hinduism and Zoroastrianism
 Hinduism and Paganism
 Indian religions
 Kalash religion
 Kiratism
 Sarna sthal
 Manichaeism
 Peterburgian Vedism
 Proto-Indo-European religion
 Proto-Indo-Iranian religion
 Hinduism and science
 Sanamahism
 Sarnaism
 Sikhism
 Tribal religions in India
 Zoroastrianism
 Religion of the Indus Valley Civilization
 Ancient Iranian religion

Notes

References

Sources

Printed sources 

 
 
 
 
 
 

 
 
 
 

 
 
 
 
 
 
 
 
 
 
 
 
 
 

 
 
 
 
 
 
 
 

 
 
 
 
 
 
 
 
 

 
 
 
 
 
 
 
 
 
 

 
 
 
  .
 
 
 
 
 
 
 
 
 
 
 

 
 
 
 
 
 
 
 
 
 
 
 
 
 
 
 
 
  
 
 

 
 
 

 
 
 

 
 
 

 
 
 
 
 
 
 
 
 
 
 
 
 
 
 
 
 
 
 
 

 
 
 
 
 
  .

Web sources

Further reading 

 Encyclopedias
 
 
 Vol. 1: Regions, Pilgrimage, Deities (2009).
 Vol. 2: Sacred Languages, Ritual Traditions, Arts, Concepts (2010).
 Vol. 3: Society, Religious Professionals, Religious Communities, Philosophies (2011).
 Vol. 4: Historical Perspectives, Poets/Teachers/Saints, Relation to Other Religions and Traditions, Hinduism and Contemporary Issues (2012).
 Vol. 5: Symbolism, Diaspora, Modern Groups and Teachers (2013).
 Vol. 6: Indices (2015).
 
 
 
 
   Ongoing monographic series project.
 

 Introductory
 
 
 
 

 History
 
 
 
 

 Philosophy and theology
  Vol. 1 | Vol. 2 | Vol. 3 | Vol. 4 | Vol. 5.
 

 Texts

External links 

 Main resources
 
 
 Many articles about Hinduism by Dotdash (formerly About.com)
 
 
 Hindu views
 Hindu Philosophy and Hinduism, IEP, Shyam Ranganathan, York University
 Vedic Hinduism SW Jamison and M Witzel, Harvard University
 The Hindu Religion, Swami Vivekananda (1894), Wikisource
 Hinduism by Swami Nikhilananda, The Ramakrishna Mission (one of the Theistic Hindu Movements)
 All About Hinduism by Swami Sivananda (pdf) , The Divine Life Society (one of the Theistic Hindu Movements)
 Advaita Vedanta Hinduism by Sangeetha Menon, IEP (one of the non-Theistic school of Hindu philosophy)
 Heart of Hinduism: An overview of Hindu traditions by ISKCON (Hare Krishna Movement)
 What is Hinduism?  by Hinduism Today magazine

 Research on Hinduism
 
 
 
 
 
 
 Hinduism outside India, A Bibliography, Harvard University (The Pluralism Project)
 What's in a Name? Agama Hindu Bali in the Making – Hinduism in Bali, Indonesia Michel Picard, Le CNRS (Paris, France)

 Audio on Hinduism
 . (Audio Version, Text)
 

 
Asian ethnic religion
Āstika
Indian religions
Moksha-aligned dharmas
Monotheistic religions
Polytheism